Sealock is a relatively rare surname. Ancestry of the Sealock family points in various directions including: England, Ireland, Scotland, Prussia, Belgium.

Several versions of family stories of an American Sealock family relate that its immigrant ancestor, Thomas, arrived as an orphaned small child and did not know his last name.  Someone, perhaps the ship's captain, gave him the surname Sealock, or "child of the sea." Thomas married Susannah Cooper in 1763 in Chester County, Pennsylvania.  They later moved to Loudoun County and Fauquier County, Virginia.  Their known children were James, John, William, Thomas, Samuel, Robert, and Mary.

References

Surnames